Ambrose Lethbridge Goddard (9 December 1819 – 15 November 1898) was a British Conservative Party politician.

Political career
Goddard was first elected MP for Cricklade in 1847 and held the seat until 1868. In 1874 he regained the seat before stepping down at the next election in 1880.

Family
Goddard was the first son of former Cricklade MP Ambrose Goddard and Jessy-Dorothea Lethbridge, daughter of Somerset MP Thomas Lethbridge.

He married Charlotte Ayshford Sanford, daughter of former Somerset and West Somerset MP Edward Ayshford Sanford and Henrietta Langham, in 1847. Together they had five children:
 Ambrose Ayshford Goddard (1848–1885)
 Jessie Henrietta Goddard (1850–1920)
 Fitzroy Pleydell Goddard (1852–1927)
 Edward Hesketh Goddard (1855–1921)
 Charles Frederick Goddard (1863–)

References

External links
 

Conservative Party (UK) MPs for English constituencies
UK MPs 1847–1852
UK MPs 1852–1857
UK MPs 1857–1859
UK MPs 1859–1865
UK MPs 1865–1868
UK MPs 1874–1880
1819 births
1898 deaths
Ambrose